Forest gardenia is a common name for several plants and may refer to:

 Gardenia brighamii, endemic to Hawaii
 Gardenia thunbergia, native to southern Africa